Curtoni is a surname. Notable people with the surname include:

Elena Curtoni (born 1991), Italian alpine ski racer
Irene Curtoni (born 1985), Italian alpine ski racer
Jakob De Curtoni, 16th century Slovenian politician 
Vittorio Curtoni (1949–2011), Italian science fiction writer